is a Japanese football player for Tokyo Musashino City FC.

Club statistics
Updated to 31 January 2018.

References

External links

Profile at Machida Zelvia

1991 births
Living people
Toin University of Yokohama alumni
People from Tama, Tokyo
Association football people from Tokyo Metropolis
Japanese footballers
J2 League players
J3 League players
Japan Football League players
FC Machida Zelvia players
FC Kariya players
Tokyo Musashino United FC players
Association football goalkeepers